Bohumír Zháňal (17 October 1931 – 16 April 2020) was a Czech middle-distance runner. He competed in the men's 3000 metres steeplechase at the 1960 Summer Olympics.

References

External links
 

1931 births
2020 deaths
Athletes (track and field) at the 1960 Summer Olympics
Czech male middle-distance runners
Czech male steeplechase runners
Olympic athletes of Czechoslovakia
People from Břeclav District
Sportspeople from the South Moravian Region